Archivium Hibernicum is a peer-reviewed history journal published annually by the Catholic History Society of Ireland. It was established in 1912 and edited by Dr. James MacCaffrey Professor of Ecclesiastical History at Maynooth College, the Archivium is primarily concerned with publishing archival source material for the study of Irish history. Its Editor-in-chief is  Thomas O'Connor.

The society and its journal is associated with the history departments of St Patrick's College, Maynooth and NUI Maynooth., it also sponsors and promotes seminars and lectures on historical subjects.

External links 
 

St Patrick's College, Maynooth
Maynooth University

Irish history journals
English-language journals
Annual journals

Publications established in 1912
1912 establishments in Ireland